Allison Audrey Eddy is a Canadian nephrologist. She was the inaugural Hudson Family Hospital Chair in Pediatric Medicine at British Columbia Children's Hospital and a clinician-scientist at the British Columbia Children's Hospital.

Early life and education
Eddy completed her Bachelor of Science degree at McMaster University and remained at the institution for her medical degree at McMaster University Medical School. Following her medical degree, Eddy completed a residency in pediatrics at Montreal Children's Hospital and a fellowship in pediatric nephrology at the University of Minnesota.

Career
Upon completing her residency and fellowship, Eddy became a member of the faculty at the University of Toronto and a nephrologist at SickKids. In 1997, she was recruited to become a Professor of Pediatrics at the University of Washington and Head of the Division of Pediatric Nephrology at Seattle Children's. From 2001 to 2007, Eddy served as the Deputy Editor of the Journal of the American Society of Nephrology and as an Associate Editor for the journal Pediatric Nephrology. Following her tenure as Deputy Editor, Eddy was appointed to the rank of Dr. Robert O. Hickman Endowed Chair In Pediatric Nephrology. That same year, she was also appointed the first Director of the Tissue and Cell Sciences Research Center at Seattle Children's Research Institute. As a result of her research and academic success, Eddy was appointed to serve on the Kidney Research Institute's Scientific Advisory Committee.

In 2012, Eddy returned to Canada to serve as the Chief of Pediatrics at British Columbia Children's Hospital (BC Children's) and Head of the Department of Pediatrics at the University of British Columbia. While serving in these roles, Eddy was also appointed BC Children's inaugural Hudson Family Hospital Chair in Pediatric Medicine in 2016. In this new position, Eddy launched a junior faculty two-year mentored scholarship program in health-care quality improvement and developed a research graduate program in Women and Children's Health Sciences. In 2019, Eddy was nominated for a YWCA Women of Distinction Award. During the COVID-19 pandemic, Eddy was elected a Fellow of the Canadian Academy of Health Sciences. She later retired in 2021.

References

External links

Living people
Date of birth missing (living people)
Place of birth missing (living people)
20th-century Canadian women scientists
21st-century Canadian women scientists
Academic staff of the University of British Columbia Faculty of Medicine
University of Washington faculty
Academic staff of the University of Toronto
McMaster University alumni
Canadian nephrologists
Fellows of the Canadian Academy of Health Sciences
Year of birth missing (living people)